Neoeuxesta is a genus of picture-winged flies in the family Ulidiidae. , it consists of the following species:
 N. fumicosta  — Samoa
 N. guamana  — Guam

References

Ulidiidae
Taxa named by John Russell Malloch
Schizophora genera